Imlaystown is an unincorporated community located along County Route 43 (Imlaystown Road) and Davis Station Road within Upper Freehold Township in Monmouth County in the U.S. state of New Jersey. It is located in ZIP code 08526. The community is accessible from Exit 11 of Interstate 195.

History
Founded in 1690, the community was once the social, economic and political focus of Upper Freehold. It consists of approximately 30 buildings from the mid-19th century. Most were rebuilt in 1898 after a fire which destroyed much of the town. It takes its name from the Imlay family, the area's major landowners in the colonial period.

The Imlaystown post office was established on April 16, 1832, and discontinued on November 28, 2009.

Historic district

The Imlaystown Historic District is a  historic district encompassing the community. It was added to the National Register of Historic Places on January 3, 1985 for its significance in commerce, exploration/settlement, and industry. It includes 29 contributing buildings.

The district includes Salter's Mill, listed individually on the NRHP in 1980. The two-story brick school building was constructed in 1930 with Colonial Revival style.

Points of interest
Ye Olde Yellow Meeting House was built in 1737 by a congregation begun in 1720.

The most recognizable building in Imlaystown is Salter's Mill situated on a  millpond that once supported an ice business as well as the mill.

The Happy Apple Inn is the community's only restaurant. Built as a stagecoach stopover between Trenton and the Jersey Shore in the mid-19th century, the current structure was rebuilt following a fire in 1904. The Happy Apple was opened in 1972 by the father of its present owners, Buddy Westendorf and wife Donna.

Preservation
Since the community's addition to the state and national registers of historic places in 1985, portions have suffered from neglect. While the community was somewhat revitalized in the 1990s, including the restoration of the millpond in 1995, many of its buildings are now dilapidated. Some are currently uninhabitable due to septic issues created by the proximity to Doctor's Creek. Upper Freehold's recent "Master Plan" was supposed to address the preservation of historic structures, rural character, and open space. Preservation New Jersey believes that preventing the decay of Imlaystown is key to realizing the vision of this plan.

Notable people
 George Franklin Fort (1809–1872), politician, physician, and judge
 Chris Tomson (born 1984), drummer with the band Vampire Weekend.

See also
 National Register of Historic Places listings in Monmouth County, New Jersey

References

External links
 
 Happy Apple Inn

Upper Freehold Township, New Jersey
Unincorporated communities in Monmouth County, New Jersey
Unincorporated communities in New Jersey
1690 establishments in New Jersey
Populated places established in 1690